Pentangular Tournament may refer to:

 A five-team knock-out first-class cricket tournament held in the West Indies in 1961. The competition eventually evolved into the tournament now (2007) known as the Carib Beer Cup
 An expansion of the Bombay Quadrangular, a first-class cricket tournament held in India. The Pentangular was held from 1937-38 until 1945-46, after which the Bombay tournament was discontinued
 Pentangular Trophy; a first-class cricket tournament held intermittently in Pakistan between 1973–74 and 2011–12.